TG Now is an album by English industrial band Throbbing Gristle. It was released in 2004 through the band's own record label Industrial Records and was their first album of original material since 1982's Journey Through a Body.

Release 

The album's 12" vinyl version was limited to 500 copies and the CD version was limited to 3,000 copies.

Critical reception
PopMatters called the album "an appetizing return from a band that had toyed significantly with the idea of what an artistically valid record release might be."

Track listing

Personnel 
 Throbbing Gristle

 Genesis P-Orridge – uncredited performance, recording
 Cosey Fanni Tutti – uncredited performance, recording
 Peter Christopherson – uncredited performance, recording
 Chris Carter – uncredited performance, recording

References

External links 

 

Throbbing Gristle albums
2004 albums